Stephen Linsky (born 12 April 1959) better known as Charlie Wolf, is a British-based American radio talk show host, disc jockey and political commentator, and formerly the Communications Director of Republicans Abroad UK. Wolf previously presented a late-night phone-in show he hosted on the radio station Talksport.

Broadcasting career
Wolf moved to the UK in 1984 to DJ for the pirate radio station Laser 558. Laser 558 was broadcasting from MV Communicator, based in international waters. In 1989, he became one of the launch presenters at Atlantic 252 and was soon presenting the breakfast show, doing so until around 1993. He also presented the network evening show on the three GWR FM stations in the west of England. In 2002 Wolf moved to Cork in Ireland to host RedFM's Cork Talks Back show and subsequently presented RedFM's breakfast show until his departure in June 2004. For a short period Wolf broadcast on both Red FM and talkSPORT, and flew from Cork to London and back on Ryanair. On a number of occasions, he presented his talkSPORT show remotely from a studio at RedFM. He was also a stand-in presenter on the Frinton-on-Sea based radio station Big L 1395.

Since leaving TalkSport radio Wolf worked mainly as a radio and television pundit and commentator, mainly debating or speaking on American politics and news stories for a variety of broadcasters including the BBC (World Service, News Channel and radio including R4 Today, Any Questions and Jeremy Vine show on Radio 2).

On 12 October 2007, he appeared on David Frost's Al Jazeera English programme Frost Over The World, debating capital punishment with Bianca Jagger.  He was a regular guest especially during US presidential elections until Sir David's death.

Wolf made a memorable appearance on BBC Radio Four's Today programme in December 2010, where he joked "with apologies to Clausewitz, politics is sport pursued by other means."

For much of the 2010s, he has appeared every Sunday night (occasionally they have been switched to Friday night) on BBC Radio 5 Live's Nolan show, with Stephen Nolan and Stephen Lowe (Bishop of Hulme).

During the 2010s, he also appeared a regular guest on the News panel on LBC with former talkSPORT presenter Ian Collins.

Writing
Whilst in Cork he also wrote a weekly column in the local Evening Echo newspaper for a time. Wolf continues to air his views in a weekly column in London-based community newspaper.

Controversies
During his talkSPORT show on 4 December 2005, Wolf described Rachel Corrie, an American activist who had been killed by an Israeli military bulldozer, as "scum." Wolf claimed later in the broadcast that he was sorry for Corrie's death, "even if by her own stupidity" but his comments were in relation to her burning a facsimile of an American flag while in Gaza. In its bulletin dated 23 January 2006, Ofcom ruled this comment to be in breach of the "Generally Accepted Standards" section of the Broadcasting Code and stated it was "seriously ill-judged".

Personal life
Wolf married London-based journalist and art critic Estelle Lovatt in August 2004. They have a son Freddie, born on 16 June 2005.

Wolf is a Jewish man who converted to Mormonism.  Whilst working at Atlantic 252 Radio he informed colleagues that he had been called to be a bishop in the Church of Jesus Christ of Latter-day Saints and was a local church elder. During the 2000s, he returned to the Jewish faith.

In June 2007, Wolf announced that he has kidney cancer, the same disease that afflicted his former talkSPORT colleague James Whale.

Wolf suffers from Parkinson's disease and has now retired from public life.

References

External links
The Charlie Wolf Blog
Archived shows CharlieWolf.com (unofficial)
Republicans Abroad UK

1959 births
American expatriates in the United Kingdom
American expatriates in the Republic of Ireland
American male journalists
American radio DJs
Living people
Offshore radio broadcasters
Radio personalities from Boston
20th-century American Jews
Massachusetts Republicans
21st-century American Jews